The Ikwo is a subgroup of the Igbo people who live in southeastern Nigeria. The area is rich in mineral resources, and the ancestors of today’s inhabitants developed bronze-casting techniques over a thousand years ago, some found in the town of Igbo Ukwu. The creativity and technical skill demonstrated by those early Igbo bronze, metal and terra cotta crafters is recognized as among the finest in the history of the world. They number around 600,000

Ikwo language is spoken in Ebonyi and Cross River.

Notable Indigenes
Chief Martin Elechi, former Governor of Ebonyi State.
 Senator Amb. Lawrence Nwuruku, Nigeria's former ambassador, former Senator and former commissioner South East of the Independent National Electoral Commission (INEC).
Eric Kelechi Igwe, Deputy Governor of Ebonyi State.
Frank Ogbuewu, Nigeria's former Ambassador and former Minister of Culture and tourism.
 Ugonna Utulor, Author of Hackers Day(novel) and National Chairman PDP Students Coalition.
 Senator Emmanuel Onwe, former Senator of the Federal Republic of Nigeria.

See also 
Igbo people

Ikwo (Local Government)

References

Igbo subgroups